is a Sanriku Railway Company station located in Miyako, Iwate Prefecture, Japan.

Station layout
Shin-Tarō Station has a side platform serving a single track.

History
Shin-Tarō station was opened between Tarō Station and Settai Station on 18 May 2020.

Surrounding area
  National Route 45

References

Railway stations in Iwate Prefecture
Rias Line
Railway stations in Japan opened in 2020